is the name of many castles in Japan.

 Tenjinyama Castle (Kazusa) in Futtsu, Chiba Prefecture (formerly Kazusa Province)
 Tenjinyama Castle (Musashi) in Nagatoro, Saitama Prefecture (formerly Musashi Province)
 Tenjinyama Castle (Echigo) in Nishikan-ku, Niigata Prefecture (formerly Echigo Province)
 Tenjinyama Castle (Etchū) in Uozu, Toyama Prefecture (formerly Etchū Province)
 Tenjinyama Castle (Inaba) in Gobō, Tottori Prefecture (formerly Inaba Province)
 Tenjinyama Castle (Bizen) in Okayama, Okayama Prefecture (formerly Bizen Province)
 Tenjinyama Castle (Sanuki) in Mitoyo, Kagawa Prefecture (formerly Sanuki Province)
 Tenjinyama Castle (Aki) in Akitakata, Hiroshima Prefecture (formerly Aki Province)

Castles in Japan
Disambig-Class Japan-related articles